Consume to Contaminate is a 2006 EP by Finnish band Rotten Sound. Upon release, the EP reached second position on the Finnish singles chart.

Track listing

Personnel
Keijo Niinimaa – vocals
Sami Latva – drums
Mika Aalto – guitars
Toni Pihlaja – bass

References

2006 EPs
Rotten Sound albums
Spinefarm Records EPs